Crime Payz is the debut studio album by American singer-songwriter Carlos Mojica. It was released on December 27, 2010, by Criminal Sound Productions. The album was selected as a Top Ten album by the Latin Beat Magazine in 2011.

Track listing

References

2010 debut albums
Carlos Mojica albums